Roussines may refer to the following places in France:

Roussines, Charente, a commune in the Charente department 
Roussines, Indre, a commune in the Indre department